Ýazguly Berdimuhammedowiç Hojageldiýew (born 16 February 1977) is a Turkmen professional football coach and former player who is the current manager of Altyn Asyr.

Career 
Hojageldyýew was born in Büzmeýin. In the same city he started playing football in his childhood. The first trainer was the honored coach of Turkmenistan Rejep Nurberdiyev.

As a football player played as a midfielder for the Turkmen clubs FC Büzmeýin, FC Dagdan Aşgabat, FC Nebitçi, FC Garagum, Kopetdag and HTTU Aşgabat.

Coaching career

Turkmenistan national team 
In February 2010, led the Turkmenistan national football team. Under his leadership the team went to Sri Lanka to participate in the final tournament of the AFC Challenge Cup 2010. In a tournament team of Turkmenistan for the first time made it to the final of the AFC Challenge Cup, losing in the final match of the DPRK team in the penalty shootout.

In March 2011, the national team of Turkmenistan has successfully entered the final round of the AFC Challenge Cup 2012, beating Pakistan, Taiwan, and played in a draw with India in the qualifying competition in Kuala Lumpur.

In the summer of 2011 the first qualifying match against Indonesia in the race for getting into the final of the 2014 World Cup team beginning in Ashgabat draw (1:1), and the humiliating defeat in the party with a 4–3 team knocked out of the fight for the right to go to the World Cup 2014.

In winter 2012 team gathered for a training camp in Turkey. In preparation for the AFC Challenge Cup 2012 team Ýazguly Hojageldyýew had a friendly match with Romania, as a result of devastating Turkmenistan team lost 4–0.

In March 2012, the team went to Kathmandu to participate in the final tournament of the AFC Challenge Cup 2012. Turkmenistan national team beat the tournament hosts Nepal (0–3) and the team of the Maldives (3–1), the match with Palestine ended in a goalless draw. In the semifinals, Turkmen defeated the Philippines (2–1). Turkmenistan national team for the second time missed AFC Challenge Cup, losing to North Korea at the end of the match (1–2).

In 2017, again headed the national team of Turkmenistan.

Honours

As a Coach 

 Turkmenistan
AFC Challenge Cup:
Runners-up: 2010, 2012

 HTTU
Champion of Turkmenistan: 2006, 2009, 2013
Silver medalist in Turkmenistan: 2007, 2008, 2011
Bronze medalist in Turkmenistan: 2012
Winner of the Cup of Turkmenistan: 2006, 2011
Turkmenistan Cup finalist: 2008
Turkmenistan Super Cup: 2009
Turkmenistan President Cup: 2007, 2008, 2009
Semifinalist of the Commonwealth of Independent States Cup: 2010

 Altyn Asyr FK
Champion of Turkmenistan: 2014, 2015, 2016, 2017, 2018, 2019, 2020, 2021
Winner of the Cup of Turkmenistan: 2015, 2016, 2019
Turkmenistan Super Cup: 2014, 2015, 2016, 2017, 2018
 Finalist 2018 AFC Cup

Individual
Ýokary Liga Coach of the Season: 2020, 2021

References

External links 
 Profile in Goal.com
 

1977 births
Living people
Turkmenistan footballers
Turkmenistan football managers
People from Ahal Region
Turkmenistan national football team managers
Association football midfielders
2019 AFC Asian Cup managers